Limacus is a genus of air-breathing land slugs, terrestrial pulmonate gastropod mollusks in the family Limacidae, the short-keeled slugs.

Species
Species within this subgenus include:
 † Limacus crassitesta (Reuss, 1868) 
 Limacus flavus (Linnaeus, 1758), the type species;  synonyms = Limax flavus Linnaeus, 1758 
 Limacus maculatus (Kaleniczenko, 1851); synonyms = Limax ecarinatus Boettger, 1881, Limax pseudoflavus Evans, 1978, Limax grossui Lupu, 1970

 Species brought into synonymy
 Limacus breckworthianus Lehmann, 1864: synonym of Limacus flavus (Linnaeus, 1758)

References

Limacidae